Abdul Jaludi is an American author, consultant, Command Center, Event Management, Monitoring, Incident Management, and Problem management adviser.

Since 2012, he has written two books, many reports, and articles, most of them on IT leadership.

In 2012 he was the winner of a global innovation contest looking for the best ideas for the future of banking The writing and publishing of Command Center Handbook: Proactive IT Monitoring in 2014 established him as an expert in the field of command centers and operational efficiency in IT operations.

In 2009 he founded a self-service application called WAIS (web automated information system) that performs automated user requests on mainframes and distributed systems including windows, unix and other operating systems. The application permits users to perform their own mainframe and distributed requests including requests for emergency access, temporary access to a limited environment, reports, scheduling requests and application stop, start and restart with full and automated validation without the need for calling a help-desk or other support team.

He is the founder of Technology Advisory Group (TAG-MC) and has been featured in Smart Enterprise Exchange, including The Pocono Record, and Smart Enterprise Exchange documents

Career

He began his career in data center operations as an entry level tape librarian with Citicorp in 1985 on Wall Street in New York City. Abdul was part of the team that helped the bank restore operations from the disaster recovery location in Secaucus, NJ when the UPS system kept failing after a power station failure resulted in an unstable utility feed. From there, he moved to Weehawken, New Jersey where he became a command center and proactive monitoring specialist.

Abdul left Citicorp in 1985 for a performance management role with Lehman Brothers, but returned to the command center two years later. Abdul remained with Citigroup, where he rose to senior vice president managing the North America Enterprise Systems Management team, responsible for command center alerting and automation. During his tenure Abdul founded numerous applications, including WAIS, an automated service desk application for adhoc scheduling and emergency access management. WAIS was chosen by the Citigroup security standards committee as the global tool for emergency access requests. He left Citigroup in 2013 under questionable circumstances.

An avid believer in the benefits of proactive monitoring and transparency within the field of information technology, he began writing about effective leadership and IT best practices. His blog in Smart Enterprise Exchange led him to writing books on process improvements from a leaders perspective and command centers.

In 2013, unable to find a book on command centers, he researched, drew from his experience as a command center manager, designer and builder, and wrote the first book on the subject.

Abdul also publishes under the pen names Atticus Aristotle and O.M. Kiam.

Books

References

External links
Abdul Jaludi Official site
Command Center Handbook Official site
Atticus Aristotle website
O.M. Kiam website

1960 births
Living people
21st-century American businesspeople
American business writers
Writers from Pennsylvania
People from Milford, Pennsylvania